Trifolium andersonii is a species of clover known by the common names fiveleaf clover and Anderson's clover. It is native to the western United States, particularly the Great Basin and adjacent high mountain ranges, including the Sierra Nevada.  It was named after Charles Lewis Anderson by Asa Gray.

Distribution
It grows in forests, mountain meadows, and talus. It has been noted to be the dominant species in dry areas on the alpine grassland steppe in the White Mountains of California.

Description
Trifolium andersonii is a perennial herb growing in a tuft or low cushion, and lacking a stem. The long-haired or woolly, silvery-gray leaves have 3 to 7 leaflets each up to 2 centimeters long. The inflorescence is a head of flowers measuring 1.5 to 2.5 centimeters wide. Each flower has a calyx of sepals with narrow, densely hairy lobes. Within the calyx is the flower corolla, which is pinkish purple or bicolored.

Various subtaxa are usually recognized by authors as varieties or subspecies.

References

External links
Jepson Manual Treatment - Trifolium andersonii
Photo gallery: Trifolium andersonii ssp. andersonii
Photo gallery: Trifolium andersonii ssp. beatleyae

andersonii
Flora of California
Flora of Idaho
Flora of Nevada
Flora of Oregon
Flora of the Great Basin
Flora of the Sierra Nevada (United States)
~
Flora without expected TNC conservation status